Just Between You and Me: The Complete Recordings, 1967–1976 is a 6-CD box set compilation album by country music duo Porter Wagoner and Dolly Parton. It covers their entire recording career with RCA Victor. The box set was released on May 5, 2014, by Bear Family Records.

The ten tracks included on 1980's Porter & Dolly were overdubbed before being released. The original, undubbed masters were released for the first time on this set, with the exception of the original master of "If You Say I Can", which had previously been released as the B-side to the duo's 1976 single, "Is Forever Longer Than Always?".  These original masters and all other unreleased recordings from this box set were subsequently released digitally as part of the "RCA Sessions 1968-1976" compilation.

There is only one recording that Wagoner and Parton both took part in during their duet years that does not appear on this collection, 1972's tribute to Chet Atkins, "Chet's Tune, Part 2", which features Wagoner and Parton among many others who had worked with him.

Following the end of their partnership, Wagoner and Parton would come together on record just a few more times. In 2006, they both appeared on Christie Lynn's cover of their song "Beneath the Sweet Magnolia Tree". In 2007, Parton would lend her vocals to Wagoner's song "Mother Church of Country Music", a tribute to the Grand Ole Opry, along with many other members of the Opry. Wagoner and Parton's last duet would be their 2007 recording of "Drifting Too Far from the Shore".

Track listing

 These tracks are presented with only Parton's vocals.

References

2014 compilation albums
Bear Family Records compilation albums
Porter Wagoner albums
Dolly Parton compilation albums